The 1968 Hammersmith Council election took place on 9 May 1968 to elect members of Hammersmith London Borough Council in London, England. The whole council was up for election and the Conservative Party gained overall control of the council.

Background
These took place at the height of the unpopularity of the Labour Government. In Hammersmith from 52 Labour, 7 Conservative and 1 Liberal councillors at the commencement of the election the Conservatives, masterminded by John Putnam and Seton Forbes-Cockell (both of whom were elected Aldermen), won in every ward except White City, with two sitting Labour Councillors in Margravine and one in Sherbrooke elected in split votes.

It is generally accepted that the Conservative Party in Hammersmith have never had as talented a group as in 1968. Of the newly elected councillors David Ashby and Patrick Ground went on to Parliament, Ben Patterson to the European Parliament, Christopher Horne fought and lost twice. Jack Rose, a popular local GP, was for many years the Chairman of the British branch of Gamblers Anonymous. The business experience of Stuart Leishman, Kim Howe, John Akerman, Paul Dwyer, Peter Fane and Sir George Bull, together with the above mentioned Aldermen led to a business renaissance in the borough, which was cut short by Ted Heath's appalling unpopularity in 1971, and the excellent organisation of Labour agent Leslie Hilliard CBE, which led to all but two - one of whom Reg Simmerson promptly resigned from the party - being defeated.

Sir Samuel Salmon, the Chairman of J Lyons and Co , then a major local employer, Seton Forbes-Cockell and Gordon Field - the last after  an abrasive and divisive election - served as Mayors from 1968-1971; William Smith and John Putman subsequently returned to the Council and were also elected Mayors.

Others were not so successful; bankrupt builder John Duff disappeared within months of the election; ILEA representative Simon de Voghelaere faced similar financial trouble, and Nick Bryce-Smith subsequently became involved in the Bradstock Insurance scandal.

In April 1987 Joan Caruana, Mayor of Hammersmith, hosted a gathering attended by 44 former members, officers and others connected with the 1968-71 council; it was the last public appearance of Lord Stewart of Fulham.

Election result

The Conservatives reversed the 1964 result winning 54 of the 60 seats, with 58% of the votes cast.

Ward results

Addison

Avonmore

Broadway

Brook Green

Colehill

College Park & Old Oak

Coningham

Crabtree

Gibbs Green

Grove

Halford

Margravine

Parsons Green

St Stephen's

Sandford

Sherbrooke

Starch Green

Sulivan

Town

White City

Wormholt

References

1968
1968 London Borough council elections
20th century in the London Borough of Hammersmith and Fulham